Michael Eisenberg (born May 18, 1971) is an American-born Israeli businessman, venture capitalist and author.

Biography
Michael Eisenberg was born in Manhattan, New York, the eldest of seven children. His father was a lawyer and his mother ran various home businesses. His grandfather established a chemical plant in Petah Tikva. His grandmother was Els Bendheim. Eisenberg was brought up in an observant Jewish home and studied at Orthodox Jewish schools. After graduating high school and attending Yeshiva University for one year, he did a gap year at  Yeshivat Har Etzion in Alon Shvut that extended into two years.  Upon his return to the United States, he completed his B.A. in Political Science and philosophy at Yeshiva University. He wanted to be a senator.

In 1993, Eisenberg and his wife Yaffa immigrated to Israel. He is a resident of Jerusalem and has eight children.  As of 2023, Eisenberg holds both Israeli and American citizenship.

Business career
Eisenberg is the co-founder and general partner of Aleph, a Tel-Aviv-based venture capital firm.

Eisenberg began his career as a consultant for Marttila and Kiley, Inc. a political consulting firm. In 1995, Eisenberg was appointed Montgomery Securities Investment Bank representative in Israel. That year, he also began working as VP Investment Banking at Jerusalem Global Investment Bank in partnership with  Shlomo Kalish. Eisenberg’s first investment was in PictureVision, a photo-sharing company, which was acquired by Kodak in the late 1990s.

Between 1997 and 2005, Eisenberg was a partner in Israel Seed Partners, an Israeli venture capital fund. His investments included Shopping.com, which went public in 2004 and was later acquired by eBay,Finjan Holdings, GuruNet and answers.com. Shopping.com reached a market cap of $810 million after its first day of trading, while GuruNet reached a market cap of $11 million on its first day.

In 2005, Eisenberg joined Benchmark Capital as managing Partner and was appointed its representative in Israel. His investments at  Benchmark included Gigya, acquired in 2017 by SAP,) Conduit, and Seeking Alpha. Eisenberg also led the investment in the website development platform Wix.com and WeWork.

In 2013, he co-founded Aleph, a venture capital fund based in Tel Aviv, together with Eden Shochat. Aleph is an early-stage fund with $850M under management focused on partnering with Israeli entrepreneurs to build large and impactful global brands. Since its founding, Aleph has invested in over 50 companies, including Melio, Lemonade Frank (acquired in 2021 by JP Morgan), Freightos, Bringg, JoyTunes, Healthy.io, Fabric, Windward, Honeybook and Nexar.

The fund has seven exits to date, among them four M&A transactions and two public offerings. Lemonade (NYSE: LMND) was traded at a market cap of $3.88 billion as of November 2021, while Windward and WeWork (NYSE: WE), went public through a SPAC.

In April 2016, Aaron Rosenson, formerly of Insight Venture Partners, joined the fund as a third partner, immigrating to Israel from New York to assume his new role. In September of that year, Aleph raised $180 million for its second fund. In December 2019, Aleph launched a $200 million third fund. Aleph now has five partners, including Yael Elad, who became operating partner in 2019  and Tomer Diari, formerly of Bessemer Venture Partners, who joined in February 2021.

In December 2021, Aleph launched its fourth VC fund amounting to $300 million.

Public and community service
Eisenberg is a board member of Yeshivat Har Etzion, which combines advanced Torah study with military service. He is also chairman of Hashomer HaChadash,  a social movement established in 2007 to continue the historic path of the Zionist movement and strengthen the values of mutual responsibility, civic action and love of the land. Eisenberg was also the director of Snunit, a non-profit organization that promotes technology studies in Israeli elementary schools.

In 2017, Eisenberg organized a Content Marketing Seminar for Olim to help new immigrants integrate in Israel’s high-tech eco-system. 
In 2020, he established Nevo Network, a fellowship program for new immigrants working in high-tech, and spearheaded  a two-year program run by the non-profit Machshava Tova that teaches high school students from disadvantaged homes to code and build websites.

Journalism and social media
In 1991-1992 Eisenberg was the news editor of ‘’The Commentator,” the student newspaper of Yeshiva University.
In 2005, he launched an Internet blog called "Six Kids and a Full-Time Job,” where he discusses politics, technology, Judaism, Zionism, macroeconomics, investments, entrepreneurship, family and parenting.

In 2010, he published ‘’The Hummus Manifesto,” a series of articles on the challenges facing Israeli high tech. Eisenberg is a frequent contributor to  Israel’s daily business papers TheMarker, Calcalist, and Hashiloah, an Israeli journal for thought and policy.

He has also written for Tablet Magazine, PB Daily and the Washington Examiner.

Eisenberg writes a weekly column for Globes about the weekly Torah portion and how it links up to technology and economics.

Published works 
In 2016-2017, Eisenberg published ‘’Ben Baruch,’’ an analysis of Tractate Brachot in the Jerusalem Talmud and ‘’The Vanishing Jew: A Wake-Up Call From the Book of Esther,’’ which looks at Megillat Esther from the perspective of economic philosophy and the struggle for money, power and control.

In August 2021, he published ‘’The Tree of Life and Prosperity: 21st Century Business Principles from the Book of Genesis.’’ 

Other books by Eisenberg are Kol Ehad Moshe Rabbenu (“Everyone can be Moses”) and Shevet Sho'eg (“Roaring Tribe”), published in Hebrew.

In May 2022, Eisenberg published Halav dvash v'evada'ut (Milk, Honey and Uncertainty), a guide to "attitudes, initiatives, structures and leaders"  in times of uncertainty."

Views and opinions
Eisenberg credits Rabbi Yehuda Amital, one of the heads of Yeshivat Har Etzion, for giving him direction and providing the inspiration for his life’s work. In answer to Eisenberg’s question about the mitzvah of where to live in the Land of Israel, Rabbi Amital said: “It’s all nonsense – set up a factory to employ 10,000 people so they can earn an honest and decent living. That is the biggest mitzvah.” 
  
Analyzing the Israeli start-up industry and the phenomenon of early exits,  Eisenberg offers a psychological hypothesis: “This is a country where people want to be their own boss...There is less of an appreciation of the impact of the size of the overall pie versus my piece of the pie” He believes that Israeli companies need to aim for bigger outcomes, such as attempting initial public offerings and SPACs, while keeping their headquarters in Israel.

Eisenberg describes himself as a "Herzlean" — a follower of Theodor Herzl's belief in civic movements.

Awards and recognition
Eisenberg was ranked #98 in Forbes Midas List: Top Tech Investors 2019, and #11 in Midas List Europe: Top Tech Investors 2020. In 2021, he rose to #8 in Midas Europe.

Media appearances
Eisenberg lectures and appears on TV, radio and podcast programs, including Harry Stebbings’ “Twenty Minute VC,”  the Tikvah Podcast, Anthony Scaramucci’s “The Mooch”  and Mark Gerson’s “The Rabbi’s Husband.”  He speaks about venture capital, Israel and entrepreneurship. In September 2021, he appeared on Dan Senor's podcast "Call me back." He also spoke about "Biblical Wisdom for the Tech Era" on Rabbi Ari Lamm's podcast Good Faith Effort. In February 2022, he spoke to Russ Roberts about Israel's image as a start-up nation and the moral aspect of investing. In June 2022, he was interviewed on the financial news magazine of Kan 11.

See also
Economy of Israel
Start-up Nation

References

External links
In the spirit of Abraham, Israel-UAE business ties must be built on a foundation of trust
Israeli author offers wisdom of Genesis for modern problems, Daily Signal
Spreading the Wealth: The Jewish holiday of Sukkot reminds us that economic opportunity must be widely available, City Journal

Living people
1971 births
Israeli Venture capitalists
Israeli investors
Yeshiva University alumni
Israeli businesspeople
Israeli company founders
Businesspeople from Jerusalem
American emigrants to Israel
Israeli writers